The following lists events that happened during the 1690s in South Africa.

Events

1690
 Settlers started moving beyond the Cape Colony driving off the Khoikhoi from the land
 Slaves in Stellenbosch attempt unsuccessfully to revolt
 16 January - Wreck of the Galiot Noord, 24 km west of Cape St. Francis after a survey voyage to Delagoa Bay and Natal

1691
 1 June - Simon van der Stel is elevated to the rank of Governor of the Cape Colony
 Dutch Reformed Churches are founded in Drakenstein and Paarl

1693
 The road to Hout Bay via Constantia Nek in the Cape Colony is completed

1695
 2 November - A total of 3,000 oak trees are planted in Wynberg following an order by Simon van der Stel

1696
 30 March - Simon van der Stel appointed a new chief of the Khoikhoi, naming him Hasdrubal and giving him a brass headed stick bearing the arms of the Dutch East India Company

1698
 27 May - Many are killed following the grounding of the ship Gravenstein at Roodestrand near Camps Bay

1699
 11 February- Willem Adriaan van der Stel, son of Simon van del Stel, is appointed Governor of the Cape Colony
  The Dutch East India Company galleon, the Wesel is dispatched to find the Prince Edward Islands but could not find them

Births

References

See Years in South Africa for list of References

History of South Africa